Tikiodon is an extinct genus of mammaliamorphs that lived in what is now India during the Late Triassic. Its type and only species is Tikiodon cromptoni, which is known from a single lower postcanine tooth discovered at the Tiki Formation of Madhya Pradesh.

Etymology
The generic name Tikiodon comes from the Tiki Formation, itself named after the nearby village of Tiki, and the Greek word , meaning "tooth". The specific epithet cromptoni is a reference to South African palaeontologist Alfred W. Crompton.

References

Prehistoric prozostrodonts
Prehistoric cynodont genera
Late Triassic synapsids
Triassic synapsids of Asia
Triassic India
Fossils of India
Fossil taxa described in 2020